WDLZ (98.3 FM) is a radio station broadcasting an adult hits format. Licensed to Murfreesboro, North Carolina, United States, it serves Northeastern North Carolina and Southside Virginia. The station is currently owned by John Byrne, through licensee Byrne Acquisition Group, LLC.

In August 2018, WDLZ ended its satellite-delivered Adult Contemporary format.  At 12:01 A.M. on August 2, 2018, "98.3 WDLZ" became known as "Earl 98.3" with an Adult Hits format.  The Station is managed by Jay Jenkins, who host the Morning Show and is popular with residents.  Earl 98.3 also broadcasts John Tesh's program "Intelligence For Your Life", weekdays from 9:00 a.m. to 2:00 p.m..

"Earl 98.3" streams its programming at https://radio.securenetsystems.net/cwa/index.cfm?stationCallSign=WDLZ .

External links

DLZ
Radio stations established in 1978